Moonshot, moon shot or Moonshots may refer to:
 Apollo program, American spaceflight program to land humans on the Moon
 Soviet Moonshot, Soviet crewed lunar programs

Books 
 Moon Shot, a 1994 book by astronaut Alan Shepard, with Jay Barbree & Howard Benedict
 Moonshot: The Flight Of Apollo 11, a 2009 picture book written and illustrated by Brian Floca

Film and television 
 Moonshot (2009 film), a television film of the story leading up to Apollo 11's moon landing
 Moonshot (2022 film), a science-fiction film
 "Moonshot" (Legends of Tomorrow), an episode of Legends of Tomorrow
 "Moonshot", an episode of The Good Doctor

Music 
 Moonshot (album), 1972 album by Buffy Sainte-Marie

Other uses 
 Moonshot (baseball), home run that is hit very high
 Moonshot (company), a counter-extremism startup
 Moonshot Server, Hewlett Packard's (formerly Compaq)'s ProLiant series of blade server computers
 Operation Moonshot, 2020 plan for mass COVID-19 testing in England

See also 
 Shoot the Moon (disambiguation)